Jason Patrick Bulger (born December 6, 1978) is an American former professional baseball pitcher. He played in Major League Baseball (MLB) for the Arizona Diamondbacks and Los Angeles Angels of Anaheim. Bulger played college baseball at Valdosta State University.

Career

Arizona Diamondbacks
Bulger made his MLB debut on August 26, while a member of the Arizona Diamondbacks.

Los Angeles Angels of Anaheim
He made his Angels debut on May 20, 2006, after the team released third baseman Edgardo Alfonzo earlier in the day to make room for him on the roster. He was reassigned to the minor leagues on May 23, to make room for callup Kendrys Morales. He was called up in  when rosters expanded on September 1.

On March 30, the Angels released their Opening Day roster and Bulger made the team. He was optioned down to the minors on August 27. On July 28, Bulger recorded his first career save in the majors against the Cleveland Indians.

On April 27, 2011, Bulger was designated for assignment after making five appearances for the Angels in the 2011 season with a 0.96 ERA and striking out seven. He cleared waivers, and accepted his demotion to AAA Salt Lake.

Minnesota Twins
He signed a minor league contract with the Minnesota Twins on November 18, 2011. He was released at the end of spring training.

New York Yankees
Bulger signed a minor league contract with the New York Yankees on April 1, 2012.

References

External links

1978 births
Living people
People from Lawrenceville, Georgia
Baseball players from Georgia (U.S. state)
Major League Baseball pitchers
Los Angeles Angels players
Arizona Diamondbacks players
Valdosta State Blazers baseball players
South Bend Silver Hawks players
Lancaster JetHawks players
Scottsdale Scorpions players
El Paso Diablos players
Tucson Sidewinders players
Salt Lake Bees players
Rancho Cucamonga Quakes players
Scranton/Wilkes-Barre Yankees players
Sportspeople from the Atlanta metropolitan area